Ambrose Delos DeLand was a member of the Wisconsin State Assembly.

Biography
DeLand was born on March 30, 1841 in Chautauqua County, New York. On May 27, 1863, he married Mary Swett. He died on April 19, 1917 in Sheboygan, Wisconsin and was buried in Sheboygan Falls, Wisconsin.

Assembly career
DeLand was a member of the Assembly during the 1877 session. He was a Republican.

References

External links

Wisconsin Historical Society

People from Chautauqua County, New York
Politicians from Sheboygan, Wisconsin
Republican Party members of the Wisconsin State Assembly
1841 births
1917 deaths
Burials in Wisconsin
19th-century American politicians